Sean Millington (born February 1, 1968) is a former Canadian Football League fullback and currently does colour commentary for the CFL’s website and the CBC. He has also acted in several movies and television shows.

Before the CFL
In 1984, Millington was a student at Carson Graham Secondary School. The rugby season had changed from fall to spring, so he decided to try out for football.  The coach took notice of his size and suggested he start out as an offensive lineman.  The following year Millington convinced the coach to let him try out at running back.

After high school Millington attended Simon Fraser University, playing with the Simon Fraser Clan.  After he graduated, he was trying out for the New York Giants.  During those tryouts Millington was quoted in an interview with SLAM! Sports in August, 2006, that the best advice that he ever received was from then Giants head coach Bill Parcells, who told him that "he was a diamond in the rough and that he needed to get more experience." Parcells then advised Millington to get that experience in the Canadian Football League and work hard there and things would work out. Millington replied that Parcells was right.

CFL career
Millington played as fullback in the CFL for 12 years with the Edmonton Eskimos, the Winnipeg Blue Bombers and the British Columbia Lions before his retirement in 2002.

When Millington was playing for the Edmonton Eskimos, he rushed for 225 yards on 29 carries in a game against the visiting Saskatchewan Roughriders on October 30, 1999.  He was at that time the most recent Canadian fullback to rush over 200 yards in a game, until Jesse Lumsden was able to rush for 211 yards against the Winnipeg Blue Bombers on August 3, 2007.

However, most of Millington's accomplishments were with the B.C. Lions - who he played with the most in those 12 years (1991–97, 2000–02). He was known in the league as the "Diesel."  With the Lions organization, Millington was a two-time Grey Cup champion and was named the Grey Cup's Most Valuable Canadian in the 88th Grey Cup game in 2000.  In that same year, Millington rushed for 1010 yards on 156 carries and ran for 6 touchdowns, while sharing the backfield duties with import Robert Drummond. He was only the 5th Canadian to accomplish this milestone.

In his other accomplishments with the Lions, Millington was named CFL West Division All-Star - five times; CFL All-Star - three times; CFL Most Outstanding Canadian Player in the West Division - three times; CFL's Most Outstanding Canadian Award - two times; and was named as BC Lions's nominee for the league's Most Outstanding Canadian - four times, before his retirement.

After retirement
After his retirement, Millington joined the CFL on CBC in 2003 as part of the broadcast panel during pre-game and half-time shows.  As part of the panel, Millington was known not to pull punches and tell things as they are, which created some interesting dialogue with former CFLer Greg Frers, with former teammate Darren Flutie and with his former GM Eric Tillman. However, after the 92nd Grey Cup game in 2004, Millington decided to resurrect his football career.

Returning to football
After two years without football, Millington came out of retirement to play another year for the Toronto Argonauts in 2005. The Argonauts had a need for Millington's services, because in his 12-year career he proved he could run and block with power. With John Avery's slashing style and Millington's power game, the Argos had a solid duo in the backfield. And when Avery suffered a slight hamstring tear in the Argos' 35-32 win over the Winnipeg Blue Bombers on October 16, the signing of Millington paid immediate dividends. However, on October 22, Millington suffered a ruptured Achilles heel in his right foot in the second quarter of their game against the Montreal Alouettes, which ended his football career, weeks before the CFL playoffs.

After his second retirement
After his second retirement, Millington rejoined the CFL on CBC broadcast, and has a weekly column on the Canadian Football League's official website on cfl.ca. Although he was acting while he was playing football, Millington started to take on more roles after his last retirement with appearances in movies such as Are We There Yet? with rapper Ice Cube, and Underworld: Evolution with Kate Beckinsale.  Millington has also appeared in the television series Blade: The Series, as Bad Blood member Bolt.  Millington also does personal training sessions and is an avid video game player.  Following his stint at CBC, Sean decided to dust off his economics degree and go to work in the financial industry. He got a job as a business development rep with the wealth management company Sentry Select.  Following his time at Sentry Select, Sean decided to join the other side of the industry and is currently working as an investment advisor for TD Waterhouse Private Investment Advice.  In his personal life, Millington has a wife and child back in Vancouver.  On January 7, 2010, Sean Millington was inducted into the BC Sports Hall of Fame along with the 1994 BC Lions Championship team.

Career statistics

References

External links
 

1968 births
BC Lions players
Black Canadian players of Canadian football
Canadian football fullbacks
Canadian Football League announcers
Canadian Football League Most Outstanding Canadian Award winners
Edmonton Elks players
Living people
Canadian football people from Vancouver
Players of Canadian football from British Columbia
Simon Fraser Clan football players
Simon Fraser University alumni
Toronto Argonauts players
Winnipeg Blue Bombers players
Canadian people of African-American descent